Kefraya ( / ALA-LC: Kifrayā) is a village in the Western Beqaa District of the Beqaa Governorate in the Republic of Lebanon, approximately  northwest of Joub Jannine. The village is home to a mixed population of Sunnis and Greek Catholics.

Château Kefraya
It is known for its vineyards and Château Kefraya wines. It was established in 1951 by its owner Michel de Bustros (Bustros Family). Shares of the winery are owned by Walid Jumblatt. 
Chateau Kefraya exports wines to a number of countries in America, Europe, Middle East, Asia, Oceania, and Africa.

Archaeology
Kefraya was also once home to the Qaraoun culture with a Heavy Neolithic archaeological industry prior to the Neolithic Revolution. A very large archaeological site was discovered in the area running along both sides of the road. Good quality flint nodules were found amongst Eocene conglomerates where a Heavy Neolithic factory site was detected with a massive abundance of Levallois cores, debitage and waste littering the surface of the site. Large numbers of flint tools were collected by workers that included a variety of scrapers on flakes, knives, axes, adzes and a segmented sickle blade. The type of flint found in the area was termed Kefraya flint.

References

External links

 Kefraiya (Beqaa Ouest)
 Wikimapia - Chateau Kefraya
 Chateau Kefraya Website
 kifraya.com Kefraya Wine Making
 marcopolis.com The Story of Chateau Kefraya
 discoverlebanon.com Chateau Kefraya

Populated places in Western Beqaa District
Sunni Muslim communities in Lebanon

Archaeological sites in Lebanon
Neolithic settlements
Heavy Neolithic sites
Great Rift Valley
Wineries of Lebanon